Laobian District is a district of the city of Yingkou, Liaoning province, People's Republic of China.

Administrative divisions
There are two subdistricts and four towns within the district.

Subdistricts:
Laobian Subdistrict, Chengdong Subdistrict

Towns:
Lunan, Liushu, Laobian Town, Erdaogou

References

External links

County-level divisions of Liaoning
Yingkou